The 55th New York State Legislature, consisting of the New York State Senate and the New York State Assembly, met from January 3 to July 2, 1832, during the fourth year of Enos T. Throop's governorship, in Albany.

Background
Under the provisions of the New York Constitution of 1821, 32 Senators were elected on general tickets in eight senatorial districts for four-year terms. They were divided into four classes, and every year eight Senate seats came up for election. Assemblymen were elected countywide on general tickets to a one-year term, the whole Assembly being renewed annually.

Canal Commissioner Henry Seymour (J) resigned in May 1831. Gov. Throop appointed Jonas Earll, Jr. (J) to fill the vacancy temporarily.

At this time, there were three political parties: the Jacksonian Democrats (supporting President Andrew Jackson; led by Martin Van Buren), the Anti-Masons, and the National Republicans (supporting Henry Clay for the presidency).

Elections
The State election was held from November 7 to 9, 1831. Harman B. Cropsey (1st D.), Allan Macdonald (2nd D.), Josiah Fisk (4th D.), Robert Lansing (5th D.), Jehiel H. Halsey (7th D.); and Assemblymen John W. Edmonds (3rd D.), John G. McDowell (6th D.) and John Birdsall (8th D.) were elected to the Senate. Birdsall was an Anti-Mason, the other seven were Jacksonians.

Sessions
The Legislature met for the regular session at the Old State Capitol in Albany on January 3, 1832; and adjourned on April 26.

Charles L. Livingston (J) was elected Speaker.

On January 9, the Legislature upheld Gov. Throop's recess appointment, electing Jonas Earll, Jr. as Canal Commissioner.

On February 6, the Legislature re-elected Secretary of State Azariah C. Flagg, State Comptroller Silas Wright, Jr., State Treasurer Abraham Keyser, Jr., Attorney General Greene C. Bronson and Surveyor General Simeon De Witt.

The Anti-Masonic state convention met on June 21, and nominated again Assemblyman Francis Granger for Governor and Samuel Stevens, of New York City, for Lieutenant Governor. They also nominated a full ticket of presidential electors, apparently composed of some supporters of William Wirt, and  some of Henry Clay, but not pledged to any candidate.

The Legislature met for a special session on June 21; and the Assembly adjourned on June 30, the Senate on July 2. This session was called to re-apportion the congressional districts, and to direct sanitary measures concerning the cholera epidemic.

The National Republican state convention met on July 26, Ambrose Spencer was Chairman. They endorsed The Anti-Masonic nominees Granger and Stevens. They also endorsed the ticket of presidential electors nominated by the Anti-Masons, who—if they won the election—should vote for Henry Clay if this would help to defeat Jackson, otherwise for Wirt. In effect, both parties were in the process of merging, becoming eventually the Whig Party.

The Jacksonian state convention met on September 19 at Herkimer, Samuel Young was Chairman. They nominated U.S. Senator William L. Marcy for Governor, and Judge John Tracy for Lieutenant Governor.

State Senate

Districts
 The First District (4 seats) consisted of Kings, New York, Queens, Richmond and Suffolk counties.
 The Second District (4 seats) consisted of Delaware, Dutchess, Orange, Putnam, Rockland, Sullivan, Ulster and Westchester counties.
 The Third District (4 seats) consisted of Albany, Columbia, Greene, Rensselaer, Schenectady and Schoharie counties.
 The Fourth District (4 seats) consisted of Clinton, Essex, Franklin, Hamilton, Montgomery, St. Lawrence, Saratoga, Warren and Washington counties.
 The Fifth District (4 seats) consisted of Herkimer, Jefferson, Lewis, Madison, Oneida and Oswego counties.
 The Sixth District (4 seats) consisted of Broome, Chenango, Cortland, Otsego, Steuben, Tioga and Tompkins counties.
 The Seventh District (4 seats) consisted of Cayuga, Onondaga, Ontario, Seneca, Wayne and Yates counties.
 The Eighth District (4 seats) consisted of Allegany, Cattaraugus, Chautauqua, Erie, Genesee, Livingston, Monroe, Niagara and Orleans counties.

Note: There are now 62 counties in the State of New York. The counties which are not mentioned in this list had not yet been established, or sufficiently organized, the area being included in one or more of the abovementioned counties.

Members
The asterisk (*) denotes members of the previous Legislature who continued in office as members of this Legislature. John W. Edmonds, John G. McDowell and John Birdsall changed from the Assembly to the Senate.

Employees
 Clerk: John F. Bacon

State Assembly

Districts

 Albany County (3 seats)
 Allegany County (1 seat)
 Broome County (1 seat)
 Cattaraugus County (1 seat)
 Cayuga County (4 seats)
 Chautauqua County (2 seats)
 Chenango County (3 seats)
 Clinton County (1 seat)
 Columbia County (3 seats)
 Cortland County (2 seats)
 Delaware County (2 seats)
 Dutchess County (4 seats)
 Erie County (2 seats)
 Essex County (1 seat)
 Franklin County (1 seat)
 Genesee County (3 seats)
 Greene County (2 seats)
 Hamilton and Montgomery counties (3 seats)
 Herkimer County (3 seats)
 Jefferson County (3 seats)
 Kings County (1 seat)
 Lewis County (1 seat)
 Livingston County (2 seats)
 Madison County (3 seats)
 Monroe County (3 seats)
 The City and County of New York (11 seats)
 Niagara County (1 seat)
 Oneida County (5 seats)
 Onondaga County (4 seats)
 Ontario County (3 seats)
 Orange County (3 seats)
 Orleans County (1 seat)
 Oswego County (1 seat)
 Otsego County (4 seats)
 Putnam County (1 seat)
 Queens County (1 seat)
 Rensselaer County (4 seats)
 Richmond County (1 seat)
 Rockland County (1 seat)
 St. Lawrence County (2 seats)
 Saratoga County (3 seats)
 Schenectady County (1 seat)
 Schoharie County (2 seats)
 Seneca County (2 seats)
 Steuben County (2 seats)
 Suffolk County (2 seats)
 Sullivan County (1 seat)
 Tioga County (2 seats)
 Tompkins County (3 seats)
 Ulster County (2 seats)
 Warren County (1 seat)
 Washington (3 seats)
 Wayne County (2 seats)
 Westchester County (3 seats)
 Yates County (1 seat)

Note: There are now 62 counties in the State of New York. The counties which are not mentioned in this list had not yet been established, or sufficiently organized, the area being included in one or more of the abovementioned counties.

Assemblymen
The asterisk (*) denotes members of the previous Legislature who continued as members of this Legislature.

The party affiliations follow the vote on the state officers on January 9 and February 6; and participation in the Jacksonian caucus on February 2.

Employees
 Clerk: Francis Seger
 Sergeant-at-Arms: James D. Scollard
 Doorkeeper: Alonzo Crosby
 Assistant Doorkeeper: James Courter (1st session)
Oliver Scovil (2nd session)

Notes

Sources
 The New York Civil List compiled by Franklin Benjamin Hough (Weed, Parsons and Co., 1858) [pg. 109 and 441 for Senate districts; pg. 129 for senators; pg. 148f for Assembly districts; pg. 212f for assemblymen]
 The History of Political Parties in the State of New-York, from the Ratification of the Federal Constitution to 1840 by Jabez D. Hammond (4th ed., Vol. 2, Phinney & Co., Buffalo, 1850; pg. 368 to 424)

055
1832 in New York (state)
1832 U.S. legislative sessions